The Niagara Thunderhawks are a Junior "B" box lacrosse team from Niagara, Ontario, Canada.  The Thunderhawks play in the OLA Junior B Lacrosse League.

History

The Thunderhawks entered the OLA in 2003.  After a slow but modest start, Niagara broke out with a .500 record in 2005 and earned their first birth into the playoffs.  Success really came in 2006 as the Thunderhawks finished 15-5-0 and finished in second place overall in the West Conference.  They beat out the upstart Hamilton Bengals in the first round 3 games straight.  In the second round they faced the more challenging Windsor Fratmen where they went the distance, winning 3 games to 2.  The Semi-final went the distance as well, as they faced the Orangeville Northmen, but this time they were eliminated in five games.

Season-by-season results
Note: GP = Games played, W = Wins, L = Losses, T = Ties, Pts = Points, GF = Goals for, GA = Goals against

External links
Thunderhawks Webpage

Ontario Lacrosse Association teams